Járol Enrique Martínez González, or, simply, Járol Martínez (born March 22, 1987), is a Colombian footballer who currently plays as a full back for Boyacá Chicó.

Career
Martínez can play as a right back or defensive midfielder. He was a starter on the Colombia national under-20 football team that failed to qualify for the 2007 World Cup. However, his performances caught the eye of Udinese, which bought him in February 2007 but backed out after he got injured at the end of the season in the Copa Mustang 1 2007. He was also one of the starters in Nacional's 2007 Colombian league victory. In July 2009, he signed with Deportivo Cali.

External links
 

1987 births
Living people
People from Quibdó
Colombian footballers
Atlético Nacional footballers
Deportivo Cali footballers
Millonarios F.C. players
Atlético Huila footballers
Deportivo Pasto footballers
Atlético Bucaramanga footballers
Deportivo Pereira footballers
Boyacá Chicó F.C. footballers
Association football defenders
Sportspeople from Chocó Department